The 13th Producers Guild of America Awards (also known as 2002 Producers Guild Awards), honoring the best film and television producers of 2001, were held at The Century Plaza Hotel in Los Angeles, California on March 3, 2002. The nominees were announced on January 10, 2002.

Winners and nominees

Film
{| class=wikitable style="width="100%"
|-
! colspan="2" style="background:#abcdef;"| Darryl F. Zanuck Award for Outstanding Producer of Theatrical Motion Pictures
|-
| colspan="2" style="vertical-align:top;"|
 Moulin Rouge! – Baz Luhrmann, Fred Baron, and Martin Brown A Beautiful Mind
 Harry Potter and the Sorcerer's Stone
 The Lord of the Rings: The Fellowship of the Ring
 Shrek 
|}

Television

David O. Selznick Lifetime Achievement Award in Theatrical Motion PicturesLawrence Gordon David Susskind Lifetime Achievement Award in Television
 Marcy Carsey, Tom Werner, and Caryn Mandabach (Carsey-Werner-Mandabach)Milestone AwardRobert WisePGA Hall of Fame
Theatrical Motion Pictures: The Manchurian Candidate and Network
Television: Happy Days and Maude

Stanley Kramer Award
 Marshall Herskovitz, Jessie Nelson, Richard Solomon, and Edward Zwick for I Am Sam

Vanguard Award
 Pixar Animation Studios (Edwin Catmull, John Lasseter, and Steve Jobs)

Visionary Award
Joel Gallen for America: A Tribute to Heroes

References

 2001
2001 film awards
2001 guild awards